Acid Witch is an American heavy metal band formed in Detroit, Michigan, in 2007. They released their first album, Witchtanic Hellucinations, in 2008 on Razorback Records. The band then released two EPs, Witch House in 2009 and Midnight Mass in 2010. The band released their second album, Stoned, in 2010, on Hells Headbangers. In 2012, Witchtanic Hellucinations was re-released on Hells Headbangers.

Style and influences
The band's musical style draws from many genres of music including death metal, doom metal, stoner metal, psychedelic music and horror films and their soundtracks such as the music of John Carpenter's Halloween. Some have also noted the influence of NWOBHM.

Lead vocalist Slasher Dave has cited Pagan Altar and Witchfinder General as some of his influences. Due to the main overtones of the music, the band has dubbed themselves "Halloween metal".

Lyrics
The band's lyrics deal with themes of witchcraft, Halloween, and Satanism, and many of their songs’ lyrics are inspired by horror films and feature a significant amount of gore and references to sex and drugs.

Discography

Albums
 Witchtanic Hellucinations (2008)
 Stoned (2010)
 Evil Sound Screamers (2017)
 Rot Among Us (2022)

EPs
 Acid Witch demo, 2007
 Witch House, 2009 (Doomentia Records)
 Midnight Mass, 2010 (Hells Headbangers)
 Spooky, Split EP with Nunslaughter, 2014 (Hells Headbangers)
 Midnight Movies, 2015 (Hells Headbangers)
Black Christmas Evil, 2018

Singles 
"It's Halloween Night (The Witches' Jack-O-Lantern)", 2019
"Witch House", 2020
"Turntable Terror", 2020

References

Death metal musical groups from Michigan
Heavy metal musical groups from Michigan
Musical groups established in 2007
American doom metal musical groups